Vaughan is a city in Ontario, Canada.
 Vaughan Metropolitan Centre station, a transit station of the Toronto subway network in the suburb of Vaughan, (displayed as simply "Vaughan" on subway train destination signs, and on some maps, and other assets on the Toronto Transit Commission)
 Vaughan (electoral district), in Ontario

Vaughan may also refer to:

Other places

Australia
 Vaughan, Victoria

Canada
 Vaughan, Nova Scotia
 Vaughan Road, in Toronto, Ontario

United States
 Vaughan, Indiana
 Vaughan, Mississippi
 Vaughan, North Carolina
 Vaughan, Texas
 Vaughan, West Virginia

Names
 Vaughan (given name), list of people with this given name
 Vaughan (surname), list of people with this surname

Others
 Vaughan's identity, a mathematical concept
 Vaughan & Bushnell Manufacturing, an American maker of striking tools
 Mount Vaughan, a mountain in Antarctica
 Vaughan Building, a building of Somerville College, Oxford

See also
 Vaughn (disambiguation)
 Vawn, Saskatchewan
 Von (disambiguation)